The Edna Staebler Award for Creative Non-Fiction is an annual literary award recognizing the previous year's best creative nonfiction book with a "Canadian locale and/or significance" that is a Canadian writer's "first or second published book of any type or genre". It was established by an endowment from Edna Staebler, a literary journalist best known for cookbooks, and was inaugurated in 1991 for publication year 1990. The award is administered by Wilfrid Laurier University's Faculty of Arts. Only submitted books are considered.

For purposes of the award, "Creative non-fiction is literary not journalistic. The writer does not merely give information but intimately shares an experience with the reader by telling a factual story using the devices of fiction ... [details deleted]  Rather than emphasizing objectivity, the book should have feeling, and should be a compelling, engaging read."

Recipients

The panel may "grant or withhold the award in any year." In fact the award has been granted every year and there were two winners in 1993 (published 1992).

In the 2020s, the awards were postponed for several years due to the COVID-19 pandemic in Canada. The nominees for 2020 were announced in July 2022, with the winner to be announced in August, and the nominees for 2021 are expected later in the year.

1990s

2000s

2010s

2020s

References

External links
 Official website
 Edna Staebler Laurier Writer-in-Residence

Canadian non-fiction literary awards
1991 establishments in Ontario
Awards established in 1991
English-language literary awards